The American Association of Community Colleges (AACC), headquartered in the National Center for Higher Education building in Washington, D.C., is the primary advocacy organization for community colleges at the national level and works closely with directors of state offices to inform and affect state policy. In addition, AACC is a member of "The Six" large, presidentially based associations dealing with higher education policy, and it collaborates with a range of organizations within the higher education community to monitor and influence federal policy and to collaborate on issues of common interest.  The association has ongoing interaction with key federal departments and agencies including the U.S. departments of Labor, Education, Energy, Homeland Security, and Commerce and the National Science Foundation.

The AACC represents nearly 1,200 two-year, associate degree-granting institutions that have an enrollment of more than 12 million students. The association's board of directors consist of 32 institutional members who serve three-year terms.

References

External links 
 

College and university associations and consortia in the United States
Education policy organizations in the United States
Community colleges in the United States